James Thomas Riggs (born September 29, 1963) is a former American football tight end in the National Football League (NFL) for the Cincinnati Bengals and the Washington Redskins. Riggs played for Scotland High School in Laurinburg, North Carolina. He played college football at Clemson University and was drafted in the fourth round of the 1987 NFL Draft.

References

1963 births
Living people
American football tight ends
Cincinnati Bengals players
Clemson Tigers football players
Players of American football from Kentucky
Washington Redskins players